Le Fol is the second album by Norwegian rock band Audrey Horne. It was released in 2007.

Track listing
All lyrics by Toschie. Music as noted.
"Last Chance for a Serenade" (Ice Dale, Tofthagen) - 4:28
"Jaws" (Ice Dale) - 3:14
"Last Call" (Ice Dale) - 3:33
"Threshold" (Ice Dale) - 5:05
"Monster" (Ice Dale) - 3:52
"Afterglow" (Ice Dale) - 3:56
"In the End" (Tofthagen, Ice Dale) - 4:58
"Pretty Girls Make Graves" (Tofthagen, Ice Dale) - 4:00
"Bright Lights" (Ice Dale) - 4:51
"Hell Hath no Fury" (Ice Dale) - 3:07
"I Wish you Hell" (Ice Dale) - 4:54
"So Long, Euphoria" (Tofthagen) - 6:20

Personnel

Audrey Horne
Toschie - vocals
Ice Dale (Arve Isdal) - guitars & bass
Thomas Tofthagen - guitars
Kjetil Greve - drums

Additional Personnel
Herbrand Larsen - keyboards, organ, Mellotron
Olav Iversen - guest vocals on "Jaws" and "So Long, Euphoria"

Production
Produced by Ice Dale & Herbrand Larsen
Recorded, engineered & mixed by Herbrand Larsen
Mastered by Håkan Åkesson at Cuttingroom, Sweden

Charts

References

2007 albums
Audrey Horne (band) albums